The Bell tower is an important building in Han Chinese Buddhist temples. Together with Drum tower, they are usually placed on both sides of the Hall of Four Heavenly Kings. It is usually on the left side while the Drum tower is usually on the right side. It is general a three-storey pavilion with a large bell hung in it. The loud and melodious sound of the bell is often used to convene monks. In each morning and night, beating the bell 108 times symbolizes the relief of the 108 kinds of trouble in the human world.

Examples

Bell tower of Xiantong Temple
The Bell tower of Xiantong Temple was built in the Ming dynasty (1368–1644). A biggest copper bell is stored in the tower. It was cast between 1621 and 1627 during the Ming dynasty (1368–1644).

References

Bibliography

Further reading

 
 

Chinese Buddhist architecture